The Livonia Cup is an international men's association football competition organised by the Estonian Football Association and the Latvian Football Federation, and contested by the reigning champions of the Meistriliiga and the Virslīga.

Winners

References

External links

Recurring sporting events established in 2003
Football cup competitions in Latvia
Football cup competitions in Estonia